Mezhirichi is a village in western Ukraine, in the Rivne Raion of Rivne Oblast, but was formerly administered within the Korets Raion. Local government is administered by Velykomezhyritska village council.

Names 

Jewish life in Mezhirichi 

Undoubtedly the most significant event in the Jewish community of Mezhirichi was the arrival there of the Maggid, Rabbi Dov Ber. After the death of the founder of Hasidism, the Baal Shem Tov, in 1761, Rabbi Dov Ber became the next leader of the movement. He moved to Rivne, and later to Mezhrichi, where he remained for the rest of his life. Mezhrichi rapidly became a magnet and place of pilgrimage for the chasidim. The location of Mezhrichi, nearer to Poland and White Russia than the Baal Shem Tov's seat in Medzhybizh, acted as a spur to the fledgling chasidic movement.

History and attractions 
The first written record of the village dates from 1544. However, archaeologists found in the area a settlement of Bronze Age and the Roman coins of II century AD.
The Magdeburg rights were provided for the village Mezhyrichi by the King of Poland Sigismund III Vasa in 1605. And in 1702 the owner of the village, Jerzy Lubomirski, started to build a stone church of St. Anthony in the village, which took 25 years to erect. The church was built on the place of an old wooden church, which had been erected by means of by Konstantine Ostrogski and which burned down in 1601.
Monuments of architecture national importance in the Rivne region is the stone church of St. Anthony (N - 1503 0) and Peter and Paul Church (wooden) (N – 1505 0) in the village Velyki Mezhyrichi.

Gallery

Notable people from Mezhirichi
Dov Ber, rabbi
Isaak Ozer Löwenstein, rabbi whose daughter Lina married Edward Eliasz Luxenburg and gave birth to Polish revolutionary socialist Róża Luksemburg.

References

External links 
 Великі Межерічі 
 weather.in.ua/Velyki Mezhyrichi (Rivne region)
 Velykomezhyritska village council
 Село Великі Межирічі: карта вулиць 
 Jews in Eastern Europe/Mezhyrichi

Cossack Hetmanate
Jewish Ukrainian history

Villages in Rivne Raion